Roberto La Barbera (born 25 February 1967) is a paralympic athlete from Italy competing mainly in category F44 long jump and pentathlon events.

Biography
La Barbera has competed in three Paralympic Games winning a silver medal.  His first games were in 2000 Summer Paralympics where he competed in the 200m, 400m, 800m, discus, long jump and pentathlon but was unable to win any medals.  This he corrected in 2004 where he won a silver medal in the long jump as well as competing in the 400m, 4 × 100 m and pentathlon. His third games were in Beijing in 2008 where he competed  in the long jump and pentathlon but was unable to win a second medal.

Achievements

References

External links
 
 
 The Jumper: A Paralympic Story

Paralympic athletes of Italy
Athletes (track and field) at the 2000 Summer Paralympics
Athletes (track and field) at the 2004 Summer Paralympics
Athletes (track and field) at the 2008 Summer Paralympics
Athletes (track and field) at the 2016 Summer Paralympics
Paralympic silver medalists for Italy
Living people
Medalists at the 2004 Summer Paralympics
Italian male sprinters
Italian male long jumpers
1967 births
Paralympic medalists in athletics (track and field)
Doping cases in paralympic sports
Sprinters with limb difference
Long jumpers with limb difference
Paralympic sprinters
Paralympic long jumpers